Nicolay Milberg Stang (21 April 1908 – 15 July 1971) was a Norwegian academic  art historian, classical philologist, editor and author.

Biography
Nicolay  Stang was born at Kristiansand  in Vest-Agder County, Norway. He was the son of Johan Ludvig Heyerdahl Stang (1874–1945) and Emilie Charlotte Milberg (1876–1965). He graduated artium from the Hamar Cathedral School in 1926. He earned his cand.philol. in Latin in 1933 from the University of Oslo.     

He was a lecturer  in the Oslo and Tanum school systems from 1935-38.  He was editorial secretary of Fritt Ord from 1936-37. During the occupation of Norway by Nazi Germany, Strang  was arrested in November 1940 and spent 18 months in solitary confinement at Møllergata 19 in Oslo. Stang was released in April of 1943 with a pledge to abstain from any illegal activities.

He worked in literary pursuits with his wife, Ragna, who managed the legacy of her deceased father, the art historian Jens Thiis. 
Starting in 1945, he contributed both as a columnist and critic with Arbeiderbladet. He also founded the literary magazine Vinduet and was its first editor from 1947 to 1951. He became dr.philos. in 1957 with his dissertation on Renaissance Florence (Livet og kunsten i ungrenessansens Firenze).  Stang received an annual government scholarship starting from 1962.

Personal life
He was married to art historian Ragna  Thiis  Stang (1909-78). They were the parents of legal scholar Tove Stang Dahl (1938–93), who married historian Hans Fredrik Dahl, and Nina Thiis Stang (1944–78), who worked for NORAD. His wife and daughter Nina died in a car collision on a road from Nairobi to Mombasa in Kenya on 29 March 1978.

Selected works
Italiensk renessansekunst i bilder med tekst (1944) with Ragna Stang
Demokratisk gjenfødelse (1945) 
 Tidskifte i maleri og skjønnlitteratur (1946)
 Leonardo da Vinci   (1949) with Ragna Stang
Hverdag blant italienere  (1959) illustrated by Chrix Dahl
Edvard Munch  (1971) with Ragna Stang

References

1908 births
1971 deaths
People from Kristiansand
University of Oslo alumni
Norwegian art historians
Norwegian columnists
20th-century Norwegian historians
Norwegian magazine founders